Alister Seng Kym Leat (14 April 1985 – 3 February 2014) was a New Zealand judoka. Leat represented New Zealand at the 2013 World Judo Championships in Brazil, and was ranked in the top 30 judokas in the world.

His younger brother Adrian dedicated to his brother his silver in the Men's 73 kg event at the 2014 Commonwealth Games.

Death
Leat committed suicide while at a judo tournament in Bulgaria in February 2014. He was 28.

References

External links
Alister Leat at The-Sports.org

1985 births
2014 deaths
New Zealand male judoka
Suicides in Bulgaria
2014 suicides